The Japan women's national water polo team is the representative for Japan in international women's water polo.

Results

Olympic Games
2020 – 9th place

World Championship

Fukuoka 2001 — 11th place
Barcelona 2003 — 11th place
Kazan 2015 — 15th place
Budapest 2017 — 13th place
Gwangju 2019 — 13th place
2022 – Withdrawn

Current squad
Roster for the 2020 Summer Olympics.

References

External links
Official website

Women's national water polo teams
Women's water polo in Japan